RTVI is a global Russian-speaking multi-platform media, which includes a news website (about 4 million users per month) and other digital platforms (2.7 million subscribers): 6 YouTube channels, 2 Telegram channels and accounts in all major social networks. Today, RTVI broadcasts in 159 countries, has more than 350 broadcasting operators around the world and 20 million viewers. 

There are RTVI report points in 14 cities all over the world: New York, Los Angeles, Moscow, Tel Aviv, Berlin, Riga, Yerevan, Bishkek, Astana, Kyiv, Tallinn, Paris, London and Vilnius. The digital editorial office of the channel is located in Moscow.

The RTVI corporate structure includes: news service, digital editorial (website, 6 YouTube channels, social networks), art direction (designers), news and non-news production, software and technical management, marketing department.

History

Ownership
The channel was founded in 1997 by Vladimir Gusinsky as a part of NTV channel. RTVI was owned by Russian businessman Ruslan Sokolov who bought the channel from its founder Vladimir Gusinsky in 2012. A group of Israeli private investors purchased RTVI International channel in 2017. In October 2019, the Armenia-born American Mikayel Israyelyan was named the new owner of RTVI.

Staff
RTVi's News Director till June 2020 was Ekaterina Kotrikadze. Russian journalist Alexey Pivovarov was appointed editor-in-chief in 2016. Pivovarov remained in this position till 25 June 2020. On 10 March 2022, the general producer of RTVI Sergey Shnurov announced the temporary termination of cooperation with RTVI.

References

External links

http://www.runyweb.com/articles/leisure/tv-radio-press/rtvi-presented-the-new-leadership-in-new-york-the-updated-concept-of-the-channel.html

 
Mass media companies of Russia
Television channels and stations established in 2002
Russian-language television stations
English-language television stations
2002 establishments in Russia
Vladimir Gusinsky